Thomas Patrick Miller (born 29 June 1990) is an English professional footballer who plays as a defender for Stalybridge Celtic. 

He has formerly played for Dundalk, Newport County, Lincoln City, Carlisle United and Bury.

Career
Miller began his career as a youth player at Norwich City but the club's then manager Glenn Roeder did not offer him a professional deal at the end of his two-year scholarship. Upon hearing the news, Miller spoke with the club's former assistant manager Jim Duffy who recommended him to Rangers. The Ibrox-based club scouted Miller in the Football League exit trials and were suitably impressed to sign him to a two-year professional contract.

Miller's progress at Rangers was hindered by a series of injuries as he damaged his cruciate ligament and broke bones in both of his feet. In December 2009, he reunited with Jim Duffy, who signed him on a month's loan for Brechin City. He debuted for the club as a substitute in their 1–0 defeat at Ayr United in the fourth round of the Scottish Cup on 18 January 2010 but this would prove to be his only appearance for Brechin as inclement weather meant it was their only game played during his loan period.

After a successful trial period, Miller agreed an initial one-year contract to join Dundalk in February 2010. He spent the 2011–12 season with Conference Premier side Newport County making 37 league appearances. Miller joined League rivals Lincoln City in 2012 and made over 100 appearances for the Imps before leaving the club in May 2015 and joining League Two side Carlisle United in June. He made his Football League debut on 8 August 2015 in a 1–1 draw away at Mansfield Town.

At the end of the 2017–18 season, Miller was released by Carlisle. In July 2018, he joined Bury on a two-year contract. He left Bury following their expulsion from League One.

He joined AFC Fylde in February 2019, signing a contract until the end of the season. On 1 October 2020, he then joined Radcliffe on a deal for the 2020-21 season. In July 2022, Miller joined Stalybridge Celtic.

Career statistics

References

External links

1990 births
Living people
English footballers
Association football defenders
Brechin City F.C. players
Bury F.C. players
Carlisle United F.C. players
Dundalk F.C. players
Lincoln City F.C. players
Newport County A.F.C. players
Norwich City F.C. players
Rangers F.C. players
AFC Fylde players
Radcliffe F.C. players
Stalybridge Celtic F.C. players
League of Ireland players
English Football League players
National League (English football) players
Northern Premier League players